The Asia/Oceania Zone was one of three zones of regional competition in the 1997 Fed Cup.

Group I
Venue: Renouf Centre, Wellington, New Zealand (outdoor hard)
Date: 11–15 March

The eight teams were divided into two pools of four teams.

For the first time, the play-off stage of the group was used to determine placings. The top two teams from each pool would be drawn in a knockout stage to determine final placings and which team would be promoted; while the remaining teams would play-off to determine final placings and which team would be relegated.

Pools

Play-offs

  advanced to World Group II Play-offs.
  and  relegated to Group II in 1998.

Group II
Venue: Renouf Centre, Wellington, New Zealand (outdoor hard)
Date: 11–15 March

The eight teams were divided into two pools of four teams to compete in round-robin competitions.

As with Group I, the play-off stage of the group was used to determine placings. The top two teams from each pool would be drawn in a knockout stage to determine which teams would be promoted and final placings; while the remaining teams would play-off to determine the other placings.

Pools

Play-offs

  and  advanced to Group I in 1998.

See also
Fed Cup structure

References

 Fed Cup Profile, Indonesia
 Fed Cup Profile, Chinese Taipei
 Fed Cup Profile, New Zealand
 Fed Cup Profile, China
 Fed Cup Profile, Hong Kong
 Fed Cup Profile, Thailand
 Fed Cup Profile, Uzbekistan
 Fed Cup Profile, Malaysia
 Fed Cup Profile, Singapore
 Fed Cup Profile, Philippines
 Fed Cup Profile, Pacific Oceania
 Fed Cup Profile, Syria

External links
 Fed Cup website

 
Asia Oceania
Sports competitions in Wellington
Tennis tournaments in New Zealand
tennis
Fed 
March 1997 sports events in New Zealand
1990s in Wellington